Fort Flagler State Park is a public recreation area that occupies the site of Fort Flagler, a former United States Army fort at the northern end of Marrowstone Island in Washington. The state park occupies  at the entrance to Admiralty Inlet and the Marrowstone Point Light lying adjacent. Port Townsend is visible to the northwest, the cranes at the Navy base on Indian Island to the west, and Whidbey Island to the east across Admiralty Inlet. Flagler Road (SR 116) terminates at the park entrance.

History
Fort Flagler was a Coast Artillery fort that along with Fort Worden and Fort Casey once guarded Admiralty Inlet, the nautical entrance to Puget Sound as part of a "Triangle of Fire" defensive plan. Admiralty Inlet was considered so strategic to the defense of Puget Sound that the three forts were placed at the entrance with huge guns creating a "triangle of fire." This military strategy was built on the theory that the three fortresses would thwart any invasion attempt by sea. Fort Flagler was established in 1897 and activated in 1899. The post was named for Brigadier General Daniel Webster Flagler, an American Civil War veteran who served as the Army's Chief of Ordnance. The fort was closed in June 1953.  The property was purchased as a state park in 1955.

Amenities and activities

Fort Flagler has hiking and biking trails, campsites, group campsites, boat launches, and historical buildings where visitors can stay - the Hospital Steward's House, the Waterway House, and the North and South Non-Commissioned Officers' Quarters. The park's museum features exhibits about the history of the fort. Guided tours of the historic fort buildings can be arranged in advance. The park plays host to the annual conferences and meetings of many area cultural and athletic groups.  Since 2020 the park has a new sea kayak eco-tourism company called Olympic Kayak Tours.

References

External links

Fort Flagler State Park Washington State Parks and Recreation Commission
Fort Flagler State Park Map Washington State Parks and Recreation Commission

Parks in Jefferson County, Washington
State parks of Washington (state)
Flagler
Museums in Jefferson County, Washington
Military and war museums in Washington (state)
Flagler
National Register of Historic Places in Jefferson County, Washington
Historic districts on the National Register of Historic Places in Washington (state)
1897 establishments in Washington (state)
1953 disestablishments in Washington (state)
Protected areas established in 1955
1955 establishments in Washington (state)